The men's 500 metres races of the 2015–16 ISU Speed Skating World Cup 1, arranged in the Olympic Oval, in Calgary, Alberta, Canada, were held on 13 and 15 November 2015.

Pavel Kulizhnikov of Russia won the first race, while Mika Poutala of Finland came second, and William Dutton of Canada came third. Alex Boisvert-Lacroix of Canada won the first Division B race.

Having beaten the Russian record on the first race, Kulizhnikov skated even better in the second race, winning it in 34.00 seconds, a new world record. William Dutton and Alex Boisvert-Lacroix, both of Canada, came second and third. Hein Otterspeer of the Netherlands won the second Division B race.

Race 1
Race one took place on Friday, 13 November, with Division B scheduled in the morning session, at 10:44, and Division A scheduled in the afternoon session, at 13:59.

Division A

Note: NR = national record.

Division B

Note: NR = national record.

Race 2
Race two took place on Sunday, 15 November, with Division A scheduled at 14:27, and Division B scheduled at 17:39.

Division A

Note: WR = world record.

Division B

Note: NR = national record.

References

Men 0500
1